Boldklubben 1913 is a Danish football club which plays in Albani Series. They play at Campus Road, in Odense on Funen. B1913 spent one season in the 1961–62 European Cup, which is the club's most notable international appearance.

From the 2006–07 season to the 2012–13 season, they merged with B 1909, and Dalum IF, to form the joint venture FC Fyn who contested in the Danish 2nd Division and in the Danish 1st Division.

Honours
Danish football championship
Runners-up (3): 1923–24, 1962, 1963
Danish Cup
Winners (1): 1962–63
Provinsmesterskabsturneringen
Winners (2): 1924, 1930
Funen Football Championship
Winners (13): 1922–23, 1923–24, 1927–28, 1929–30, 1932–33, 1933–34, 1935–36, 1955–56‡, 1984‡, 1991‡, 2000‡, 2003‡, 2015–16, 2019–20
Runners-up (6): 1924–25, 1925–26, 1926–27, 1942–43‡, 1962‡, 2006R
FBUs Pokalturnering
Winners (10): 1925, 1926, 1927, 1932, 1934, 1935, 1937, 1939, 1946, 1952
Runners-up (5): 1930, 1936, 1940, 1941, 1951
‡: Honour achieved by reserve teamR: Status as a reserve team for FC Fyn

External links
Official site (in Danish)

 
Association football clubs established in 1913
1913, Boldklubben
Sport in Odense
1913 establishments in Denmark